The 2012 Damallsvenskan, part of the 2012 Swedish football season, was the 25th season of Damallsvenskan since its establishment in 1988. The 2012 fixtures were released on 8 December 2011. The season began on 9 April 2012 and ended on 3 November 2012. LdB FC Malmö were the defending champions, having won their 7th title the previous season. In an interesting season finish Malmö had a five points advantage over Tyresö two days before the end. On the second last matchday though Malmö only drew, while Tyresö won and the teams then met on the final matchday to play for the championship. Due to a better goal difference Tyresö won its first title after a late goal for a 1–0 win.

A total of twelve teams contested the league, 10 returning from the 2011 season and two promoted from Division 1.

Teams 
Hammarby IF DFF and Dalsjöfors GoIF were relegated at the end of the 2011 season after finishing in the bottom two places of the table. They were replaced by Division 1 division champions AIK and Vittsjö GIK.

Stadia and locations

Table

Results

Season prizes

Season statistics

Top scorers

Top assists

References

External links 
  
 Season on soccerway.com

Damallsvenskan seasons
1
Dam
Sweden
Sweden